Mabvuku is a suburb east of Harare, the capital city of Zimbabwe.

History

In 2005, Operation Murambatsvina destroyed slums in Mabvuku and other areas of Harare such as Budiriro and Mbare as well as nearby Chitungwiza. By the mid-2010s, the number of people squatting in informal settlements was growing again. A new settlement in Mabvuku was called Bob.

In 2021, the Clean City program brought clean affordable drinking water to Mabvuku. This followed reports the previous year that water suppliers were only delivering water to the area if women would have sex with them. Many residents had gone without running water for 30 years.

Effects of economic decline
The Mabvuku-Tafara towns have been seriously affected by the decline of the economy which have compromised the Harare City Council's ability to provide services to this outlying towns. The residents have suffered through water and power cuts, acknowledged to be the worst scenario in the all of Harare. Cases of cholera, blamed on the relentless water cuts, he been recorded across the Mabvuku-Tafara area.

Climate

Notable people from the town 

Wilfred Mugeyi
William Mugeyi

See also
 Epworth

References

Suburbs of Harare
Squatting in Zimbabwe